The  is a private university located in Musashino, Tokyo, Japan that offers courses in Business Administration, Economics, Law, International Relations and Urban Innovation.

Ota believed that education should be based on a spiritual closeness between teachers and students. It was a unique school at the time, as it accommodated all students in dormitories divided by course of study; Continental Asia, Southern Pacific Islands and Japan ("Homeland").

It shares its name with another university located in Taiwan.

The University produced an animated short, in 2015, to promote its Department of Urban Innovation.

Tohto University Baseball League

Asia University has performed consistently well in Division 1 of the Tohto University Baseball League, the intercollegiate baseball league that features 21 prominent universities in the Tokyo area.

Faculties
 Faculty of Business
 Faculty of Economics
 Faculty of Law
 Faculty of International Relations(IR)
Students in their first year are required to study abroad (see the section Studying Abroad)
From their 2nd year, students start to learn one of the foreign languages(Arabic language, Chinese language, Hindi language, Indonesian language, (Japanese only for international students), Korean language, Spanish language) for region studies. In addition, the students each take a seminar class every year. Because of these systems, IR has smaller classes than the other faculties.

 Junior College

Center for English Language Education
The Asia University (AU) Center for English Language Education (CELE) is a department at Asia University, located in Musashino, Tokyo, Japan. Serving the university since 1989, CELE was founded by former AU President Professor Shinkichi Eto. CELE employs between 25-30 native English speakers as full-time lecturers.

Events 
Freshman Orientation Camp(Deai no Hiroba)
Sports Festival
Asia Festival(School Festival)

Studying abroad 
AUAP (Asia University America Program)
All International Relations(IR) students (except its international students and Yume-College students) are required to study at one of following universities: Central Washington University (CWU), Eastern Washington University (EWU), Western Washington University (WWU) in Washington or the Arizona State University in Arizona, the United States of America, for 5 months in their 2nd year.
If other students who wish to participate in this programme, it is open for them too in their 2nd year.
AUCP (Asia University China Program)
AUEP (Asia University Exchange Program)
AUGP (Asia University Global Program)

Notable alumni and faculty 
Shudo Higashinakano: Historian and professor of intellectual history who argues that the rape of Nanjing is a hoax.
Becky: A popular television host, and occasional actress and singer.
Aoi Nakamura: Actor
Ai Kato: Actress
Ayaka Nishiwaki: Member of technopop group Perfume.
Risa Yoshiki: A glamour model, actress, celebrity, and enka singer.
Hiromitsu Kitayama: Member of Johnny's Entertainment group Kis-My-Ft2
Yoshihiko Kikuchi: A leader in the Church of Jesus Christ of Latter-day Saints
Matsumura Hokuto: Member of Johnny's Entertainment group SixTONES

References

External links
 Asia University of Japan
 BBC story on Shudo Higashinakano
 Japan Focus Story on Shudo Higashinakano

Private universities and colleges in Japan
Educational institutions established in 1941
Musashino, Tokyo
1941 establishments in Japan